Lise Overgaard-Munk (born May 26, 1989) is a Danish football striker who plays for 1.FFC Frankfurt of the German Frauen-Bundesliga. She has previously played in the top Bundesliga with 1.FFC Frankfurt and for Danish Elitedivisionen teams Fortuna Hjørring and Brøndby IF. She has also represented the Denmark women's national football team.

Club career
In the early part of her career Munk represented both Fortuna Hjørring and Brøndby in the UEFA Women's Champions League.

After scoring 28 goals for Brøndby during the 2012 calendar year, Munk secured a transfer to 1.FFC Frankfurt in January 2013. She scored two goals in six appearances but missed the entire 2013–14 season through injury and asked to be released from her contract a year early before 2014–15. By then she had recovered her fitness and was in search of regular first team football. The following day she was unveiled as a 1. FC Köln player.

International career
Munk scored a hat-trick in her senior Danish national team debut, a crushing 15–0 home win over Georgia in October 2009.

References

External links
 Danish Football Union (DBU) statistics 
 

1989 births
Living people
Danish women's footballers
Denmark women's international footballers
Brøndby IF (women) players
Fortuna Hjørring players
1. FFC Frankfurt players
Expatriate women's footballers in Germany
Danish expatriate sportspeople in Germany
Danish expatriate men's footballers
1. FC Köln (women) players
People from Frederikshavn
Women's association football forwards
Frederikshavn fI players
Sportspeople from the North Jutland Region